Louis Butler may refer to:

 Louis B. Butler (born 1952), justice of the Wisconsin Supreme Court
 Louis Butler (footballer) (born 2001), Australian rules footballer